was a Japanese daimyō of the early Edo period, who ruled the Chōshū Domain.

Family
Father: Mōri Terumoto (1553–1625)
Wife: Kisahime (1598–1655) daughter of Yūki Hideyasu and adopted daughter of Tokugawa Hidetada
Heir: Mōri Tsunahiro

References
 Mōri genealogy on "Edo 300 HTML" (30 Oct. 2007)

1595 births
1651 deaths
Mōri clan
Daimyo